Alexander Sotirios Kechris (born March 23, 1946) is a set theorist and logician at the California Institute of Technology.

Contributions
Kechris has made contributions to the theory of Borel equivalence relations and the theory of automorphism groups of uncountable structures. His research interests cover foundations of mathematics, mathematical logic and set theory and their interactions with analysis and dynamical systems.

Kechris earned his Ph.D. at UCLA in 1972 under the direction of Yiannis N. Moschovakis, with a dissertation titled Projective Ordinals and Countable Analytic Sets. During his academic career he advised 23 PhD students and sponsored 20 postdoctoral researchers.

In 2012, he became an Inaugural Fellow of the American Mathematical Society.

Honors
1986 - Invited Speaker at the International Congress of Mathematicians in Berkeley (Mathematical Logic & Foundations) 
1998 - Gödel Lecturer (Current Trends in Descriptive Set Theory).
2003 - Received the Karp Prize, along with Gregory Hjorth for joint work on Borel equivalence relations, in particular for their results on turbulence and countable Borel equivalence relations
2004 - Tarski Lecturer (New Connections Between Logic, Ramsey Theory and Topological Dynamics)

Selected publications
 A. S. Kechris, "Classical Descriptive Set Theory", Springer-Verlag, 1995.
 H. Becker, A. S. Kechris, "The descriptive set theory of Polish group actions" (London Mathematical Society Lecture Note Series), University of Cambridge, 1996.
 A. S. Kechris, V. G. Pestov and S. Todorcevic, "Fraïssé limits, Ramsey theory and topological dynamics of automorphism groups", Geometric and Functional Analysis 15 (1) (2005), 106-189.
 A. S. Kechris, "Global Aspects of Ergodic Group Actions",  Mathematical Surveys and Monographs, 160, American Mathematical Society, 2010.

References

External links
 A. S. Kechris biographical sketch
 Kechris's web page at Caltech
 Collected works of Alexander S. Kechris

American logicians
Greek logicians
20th-century Greek mathematicians
21st-century Greek mathematicians
California Institute of Technology faculty
1946 births
Living people
Set theorists
Fellows of the American Mathematical Society
Tarski lecturers
Philosophers from California
Gödel Lecturers